Eva Moberg (born 16 April 1954) is a Swedish orienteering competitor. She received a silver medal in the relay event at the 1978 World Orienteering Championships in Kongsberg, together with Karin Rabe and Kristin Cullman.

References

1954 births
Living people
Swedish orienteers
Female orienteers
Foot orienteers
World Orienteering Championships medalists